Stefano de Vicari, O.P. (died 1620) was a Roman Catholic prelate who served as Bishop of Nocera de' Pagani (1610–1620).

Biography
Stefano de Vicari was ordained a priest in the Order of Preachers. On 4 November 1610, he was appointed during the papacy of Pope Paul V as Bishop of Nocera de' Pagani. On 27 December 1610, he was consecrated bishop by Girolamo Bernerio, Cardinal-Bishop of Porto e Santa Rufina, with Vincenzo Bonincontro, Bishop of Agrigento, and Giovanni Canauli, Bishop of Fossombrone, serving as co-consecrators. He served as Bishop of Nocera de' Pagani until his death in 1620.

References

External links and additional sources
 (for Chronology of Bishops) 
 (for Chronology of Bishops) 

17th-century Italian Roman Catholic bishops
Bishops appointed by Pope Paul V
1620 deaths